Women in the Night is a 1948 American film directed by William Rowland shot in Mexico. The film is also known as When Men Are Beasts. The film depicts activities of German and Japanese who wish revenge on the Allies with a cosmic ray weapon.

Cast 
 Tala Birell as Yvette Aubert
 William Henry as Philip Adams / Maj. von Arnheim
 Richard Loo as Col. Noyama
 Virginia Christine as Claire Adams
 Bernadene Hayes as Frau Thaler
 Gordon Richards as Col. von Meyer
 Frances Chung as Li Ling
 Jean Brooks as Maya
 Kathy Frye as Helen James
 Helen Mowery as Sheila Hallett
 Benson Fong as Chang
 Helen Brown as Angela James
 Frederick Giermann as Major Eisel
 Philip Ahn as Prof. Kunioshi
 Arno Frey as Field Marshal von Runzel
 Beal Wong as General Mitikoya
 Iris Flores as Maria Gonzales
 Frederic Brunn as Lt. Kraus
 Harry Hays Morgan as General Hundman
 Paula Allen as Nurse
 Joy Gwynell as Suicide Girl
 William Yetter Sr. as German Officer
 Noel Cravat as Japanese Officer
 Wolfgang Zilzer as German Doctor

DVD release 
The film was released on DVD April 19, 2005.

External links 
 
 

1948 films
1940s spy drama films
American spy drama films
American war drama films
1940s English-language films
1940s French-language films
American black-and-white films
Films set in Shanghai
Films set in 1945
American World War II films
1940s war drama films
1948 drama films
1940s multilingual films
American multilingual films
Films directed by William Rowland
1940s American films